The Liga F is the highest league of women's football in Spain, starting in 1988. The following players must meet both of the following two criteria:
Have played at least one Liga F game. Players who were signed by Liga F clubs, but only played in lower leagues, cup games and/or European games, or did not play in any competitive games at all, are not included.
Are considered foreign, i.e., outside Spain determined by the following:
A player is considered foreign if she is not eligible to play for the national team of Spain.
More specifically,
If a player has been capped on international level, the national team is used; if she has been capped by more than one country, the highest level (or the most recent) team is used. These include Spain players with dual citizenship.
If a player has not been capped on international level, her country of birth is used, except those who were born abroad from Spanish parents or moved to Spain at a young age, and those who clearly indicated to have switched her nationality to another nation.

The first foreign player in Spain's highest women's league was Brazilian Milene Domingues who signed for Rayo Vallecano, but only trained with them due to the Royal Spanish Football Federation's regulations at the time not allowing foreigners to play in the league.

Clubs listed are those which have contracted the player. Note that calendar years are used. This follows general practice in expressing years a player spent at club.

In bold: players who are currently under contract by a Liga F club.

Africa (CAF)

Cameroon
 Ajara Nchout – Atlético Madrid – 2021
 Colette Ndzana – Granadilla Tenerife – 2023–

Egypt
 Sara Ismael – Espanyol – 2015–16

Equatorial Guinea
 Genoveva Añonman – Atlético Madrid – 2016–17
 Jade Boho – Torrejón – 2003–07, Rayo Vallecano – 2007–13, 2014–15, Atlético Madrid – 2013–14, Madrid CFF – 2017–18, Logroño – 2018–21, Alhama – 2022–

Gambia
 Fatou Kanteh – Logroño – 2018–19, Sporting de Huelva – 2019–22, Villarreal – 2022–

Ghana
 Princella Adubea – Sporting de Huelva – 2019–20
 Mukarama Abdulai – Alavés – 2021–23

Ivory Coast
 Jessica Aby – Alavés – 2022–

Mali
 Bassira Touré – Málaga – 2018–19

Morocco
 Yasmin Mrabet – Madrid CFF – 2017–20 ,Rayo Vallecano – 2020–21, Levante Las Planas – 2022–

Namibia
 Zenatha Coleman – Zaragoza CFF – 2018, Valencia – 2018–20, Sevilla – 2020–22

Nigeria
 Rasheedat Ajibade – Atlético Madrid – 2021–
 Asisat Oshoala – Barcelona – 2019–
 Toni Payne – Sevilla – 2018–

South Africa
 Ode Fulutudilu – Málaga – 2019, Real Betis – 2023–
 Noko Matlou – Eibar – 2021–22

Zambia
 Racheal Kundananji – Eibar – 2021–2022, Madrid CFF – 2022–

Zimbabwe
 Rutendo Makore – Sporting de Huelva – 2017–18

Europe (UEFA)

Andorra
 Teresa Morató – Rayo Vallecano – 2020–21, Villarreal – 2021–

Czech Republic
 Klára Cahynová – Sevilla – 2021–
 Andrea Stašková – Atlético Madrid – 2022–

Denmark
 Line Røddik Hansen – Barcelona – 2016–18
  Caroline Møller – Real Madrid – 2021–

England
Chelsea Ashurst – Málaga – 2008–12, 2018–19, Sporting de Huelva – 2012–13, 2019–, Barcelona – 2013–15
Rinsola Babajide – Real Betis – 2022–
 Lucy Bronze – Barcelona – 2022–
 Toni Duggan – Barcelona – 2017–19, Atlético Madrid – 2019–21
Jade Moore – Atlético Madrid – 2020
Lianne Sanderson – Espanyol – 2011–12
Chioma Ubogagu – Real Madrid – 2019–21
 Keira Walsh – Barcelona – 2022–

Finland
Sanni Franssi
Iina Salmi

France
 Élise Bussaglia
  Naomie Feller
  Méline Gérard
 Jade Le Guilly
 Kheira Hamraoui
 Sophie Istillart (Athletic)
  Sandie Toletti

Germany
Bibiane Schulze (Athletic, Valencia)

Italy
Pamela Conti
Katia Serra

Netherlands
Mandy van den Berg
Merel van Dongen (Betis, Atlético)
Damaris Egurrola (Athletic)
Stefanie van der Gragt (Barcelona)
Ellen Jansen (Valencia)
Lieke Martens
Sari van Veenendaal (Atlético)

North Macedonia
Nataša Andonova

Norway
  Caroline Graham Hansen 
 Ingrid Syrstad Engen

Poland
Kayla Adamek

Portugal
 Matilde Fidalgo
 Diana Gomes
 Andreia Jacinto
 Emily Lima
 Andreia Norton
 Fátima Pinto

Romania
 Olivia Oprea
 Simona Vintilă

Scotland
 Caroline Weir (Real Madrid)

Serbia
 Jelena Čanković
 Allegra Poljak

Sweden
 Kosovare Asllani
 Hanna Lundkvist
  Freja Olofsson

Switzerland
 Ana-Maria Crnogorčević
Vanessa Bernauer

Turkey
Jessica O'Rourke

North, Central America and Caribbean (CONCACAF)

Bermuda
Kenni Thompson

Canada
Marie-Yasmine Alidou

Costa Rica
Noelia Bermúdez

Dominican Republic
Manuela Lareo
Lucía León

Guatemala
Ana Lucía Martínez

Jamaica
Trudi Carter

Mexico
 Charlyn Corral
 Maribel Domínguez 
 Mónica Flores
 Sabrina Flores
 Kiana Palacios
 Patricia Pérez
Kenti Robles
 Pamela Tajonar

Panama
Aldrith Quintero

United States
Jordan Clark
Danica Evans
Claire Falknor
Bri Folds
Amanda Frisbie
Marci Jobson
Hannah Keane
Mariah Lee
Joanna Lohman
Sydny Nasello
Clare Pleuler
Taylor Porter
Kylie Strom

South America (CONMEBOL)

Argentina
 Estefanía Banini
 Mariela Coronel
 Ludmila Manicler
 Florencia Quiñones

Brazil
 Geyse
 Kátia
 Ludmila
 Rosana
 Simone
 Kathellen Sousa

Chile
 Karen Araya
 Francisca Lara
 Nayadet López
 Camila Sáez

Colombia
Catalina Pérez
Leicy Santos

Ecuador
Kerlly Real

Paraguay
Lice Chamorro

Peru
Claudia Cagnina
Pierina Núñez

Uruguay
Yannel Correa
Pamela González
Stefanía Maggiolini

Venezuela
Deyna Castellanos

Notes

References

Spain Women
Liga F
 
Association football player non-biographical articles